Gwriad (Latin: Guriat) is a Welsh name that may refer to:

 Guret of Alt Clut (died 658),ruler of Alt Clut, the Brythonic kingdom later known as Strathclyde
 Gwriad, the father of Edwyn ap Gwriad
 Gwriad ap Elidyr, 8th-century Brythonic chieftain
 Gwriad ap Merfyn, 9th-century prince of Gwynedd, Wales